Đorđe Pantelić (born 29 November 1999) is a Serbian professional footballer who plays as a winger for Bosnian club Radnik Bijeljina.

Club career
On 8 July 2021, he signed with Radnik Bijeljina in Bosnia and Herzegovina.

Career statistics

Club

References

External links
 
 
 

1999 births
People from Brčko District
Serbs of Bosnia and Herzegovina
Living people
Serbian footballers
Association football midfielders
FK Vojvodina players
FK Kabel players
FK Inđija players
FK Radnik Bijeljina players
Serbian First League players
Serbian SuperLiga players
Premier League of Bosnia and Herzegovina players
Serbian expatriate footballers
Expatriate footballers in Bosnia and Herzegovina
Serbian expatriate sportspeople in Bosnia and Herzegovina